Yosef Blau is an American Orthodox rabbi. He currently serves as the mashgiach ruchani at Rabbi Isaac Elchanan Theological Seminary since 1977. He is also the former president of the Religious Zionists of America.

Education
Blau earned his Bachelor of Arts degree in 1959 from Yeshiva College studying Mathematics. He earned a Masters of Science degree at Yeshiva University's Belfer Graduate School of Science in 1960, and was ordained at Rabbi Isaac Elchanan Theological Seminary in 1961 by Rabbi Yosef Dov Soloveitchik.

Career
In the past, he served as the assistant principal at the Maimonides School in Brookline, Massachusetts, principal at the Hebrew Theological College in Skokie, Illinois, and principal at the Jewish Educational Center in Elizabeth, New Jersey.

In communal life, Blau served as national president of Yavneh, the National Religious Jewish Students Association, and as a member of that organization's National Advisory Board. He also served as vice president of the National Conference of Yeshiva Principals.

Blau is a member of the Rabbinical Council of America and serves on the executive board of the Orthodox Caucus, a national task force addressing practical issues challenging the Jewish world. He is also on the executive commission of the Orthodox Forum and the rabbinic advisory board of USSR, (Students Serving Soviet Jewry). He has lectured and taught Torah around the world.

Blau previously served on the executive board of directors of The Awareness Center. On December 22, 2009 he was the moderator on a panel in Yeshiva University dealing with homosexual men in the Orthodox Jewish community.

Blau serves as one of the board of directors for Jewish Community Watch, an organization focusing on child abuse awareness and prevention within the Orthodox community.

References

External links
Official Yeshiva University bio

Living people
Yeshiva University alumni
Mashgiach ruchani
American Modern Orthodox rabbis
Orthodox rabbis from New York City
Rabbi Isaac Elchanan Theological Seminary semikhah recipients
Sexual abuse victim advocates
Religious Zionist Orthodox rabbis
Yeshiva University faculty
Year of birth missing (living people)
20th-century American rabbis
21st-century American rabbis